Vienna Waltzes (German: Wiener Walzer) is a 1951 Austrian historical musical drama film directed by Emil E. Reinert and starring Marte Harell, Anton Walbrook and Lilly Stepanek. It is also known by the alternative title of Vienna Dances.

It portrays the life of the composer Johann Strauss. The film's sets were designed by the art director Otto Niedermoser.

Cast

References

Bibliography 
 Fritsche, Maria. Homemade Men in Postwar Austrian Cinema: Nationhood, Genre and Masculinity. Berghahn Books, 2013.

External links 
 

1951 films
1950s biographical films
1950s historical musical films
Austrian historical musical films
Austrian biographical films
1950s German-language films
Films directed by Emil-Edwin Reinert
Films set in Vienna
Films set in the 19th century
Films about classical music and musicians
Films about composers
Cultural depictions of Johann Strauss I
Cultural depictions of Klemens von Metternich
Films set in the Austrian Empire
Austrian black-and-white films